Dalton Grant (born 8 April 1966) is a former high jumper.

Athletics career
Grant won a total number of four national titles for Great Britain (AAA Championships) in the men's high jump event. His personal best jump is 2.36 metres, achieved at the 1991 World Championships in Tokyo. He has a personal indoor best of 2.37 metres.

Grant appeared at five consecutive Commonwealth Games. He represented England in the high jump, at the 1986 Commonwealth Games in Edinburgh, Scotland. Four years later he won a silver medal for England, at the 1990 Commonwealth Games in Auckland, New Zealand which was followed by a third Games appearance for England, at the 1994 Commonwealth Games in Victoria, British Columbia, Canada. He finally won a gold medal at the 1998 Games and competed in the high jump for the fifth successive Games in 2002.

Biography
Grant was born in Hackney to parents from Jamaica and lived in Brooke Road, Upper Clapton. He went to Hackney Downs School where he started to high jump. He also represented Hackney in the London Youth Games in athletics.

He was later inducted into the London Youth Games Hall of Fame in 2011.

Personal life
He was a board director of the London 2012 Olympic bid team and he was also a captain of the Great Britain & NI team. Grant was appointed president of the South of England Athletics Association for 2010–2011. Dalton has set up the Dalton Grant Academy in Trinidad and Tobago. He is also a patron of Mossbourne Academy.

Achievements

References

External links

Dalton Grant at Sporting-Heroes

1966 births
Living people
People from Upper Clapton
People educated at Hackney Downs School
English male high jumpers
Athletes (track and field) at the 1988 Summer Olympics
Athletes (track and field) at the 1992 Summer Olympics
Athletes (track and field) at the 1996 Summer Olympics
Athletes (track and field) at the 1986 Commonwealth Games
Athletes (track and field) at the 1990 Commonwealth Games
Athletes (track and field) at the 1994 Commonwealth Games
Athletes (track and field) at the 1998 Commonwealth Games
Athletes (track and field) at the 2002 Commonwealth Games
Olympic athletes of Great Britain
Commonwealth Games gold medallists for England
Black British sportspeople
English people of Jamaican descent
British masters athletes
European Athletics Championships medalists
Commonwealth Games medallists in athletics
Medallists at the 1990 Commonwealth Games
Medallists at the 1998 Commonwealth Games